Maurice Chevit (31 October 1923 – 2 July 2012) was a French actor.

Maurice Chevit made his theatrical début just after the Second World War, and made his first screen appearance in 1946 in René Clément's film Le Père tranquille. In August 1950, the Theatre de la Huchette in Paris presented Pepita ou Cinq cents francs de bonheur, a three-act comedy that Chevit co-wrote with Henri Fontenille; Chevit himself appeared in it, playing alongside Jacqueline Maillan, Pierre Mondy and Jacques Jouanneau.  He was seen in many small film roles during the 1950s and 1960s, working with producers such as Henri Decoin and André Cayatte, but he was best known as a stage actor.

Television
Maigret (2002) - (French tv series), Sn 8 Ep 1 "To Any Lengths" "Signe Picpus", M. Lecloagen

Selected filmography

 Mr. Orchid (1946) - Un maquisard (film debut)
 Contre-enquête (1947)
 L'Arche de Noé (1947) - Le dessinateur
 Between Eleven and Midnight (1949) - L'employé aux empreintes (uncredited)
 Histoires extraordinaires à faire peur ou à faire rire... (1949)
 La belle que voilà (1950) - Le photographe (uncredited)
 Without Leaving an Address (1951) - Le soldat qui dort dans la salle d'attente (uncredited)
 Under the Paris Sky (1951) - Le peintre (uncredited)
 Clara de Montargis (1951) - Edouard - le majordome
 Yours Truly, Blake (1954) - Un complice
 Chantage (1955) - Un complice
 Les Hussards (1955) - Camille - un soldat
 Deuxième bureau contre inconnu (1957)
 On Foot, on Horse, and on Wheels (1957) - Léon
 Why Women Sin (1958) - Un consommateur (uncredited)
 The Mask of the Gorilla (1958) - Le second inspecteur del'hygiène
 Rapt au Deuxième Bureau (1958) - Dédé
 Croquemitoufle (1959)
 Famous Love Affairs (1961) - Un employé du Wurtemberg (uncredited)
 How to Succeed in Love (1962) - L'agent
 Le glaive et la balance (1963) - Un inspecteur
 Les baisers (1964) - Le père
 Relax Darling (1964) - Hubert
 The Gorillas (1964) - Le premier contractuel
 The Sleeping Car Murders (1965) - Un inspecteur
 Le chien fou (1966) - Le mécano
 The Curse of Belphegor (1967) - Garnier
 Asterix the Gaul (1967) - (voice)
 Astérix et Cléopâtre (1968) - (voice)
 L'auvergnat et l'autobus (1969) - Un syndicaliste (uncredited)
 Saturnin et le Vaca-Vaca (1969) - (voice)
 L'âne de Zigliara (1970) - Le maire de Sainte-Marie
 La belle affaire (1973)
 Le viol (1973)
 Dis bonjour à la dame!.. (1977) - Totor, le poivrot
 Molière (1978) - The priest of the school
 Le sucre (1978) - Lomont
 Le Coup de Sirocco (1979) - General Bauvergne
 French Fried Vacation 2 (1979) - Marius 
 Signé Furax (1981) - Monsieur Léon, obéliscologue
 La femme ivoire (1984) - M. Cheneau
 Leave All Fair (1985, New Zealand film, shot in France) - Alain
 My Brother-in-Law Killed My Sister (1986) - Monsieur Bongrand
  (1986) - Jules
 Lévy et Goliath (1987) - Oncle Mardoché
 Julien Fontanes, magistrat (1986-1987, TV Series) - Banyuls / Max
 De guerre lasse (1987) - Elie Blumfield, le grand-père juif
 La comédie du travail (1988) - Le vieux chômeur
 Je t'ai dans la peau (1990) - L'abbé Roussel
 The Hairdresser's Husband (1990) - Ambroise Dupré dit Isidore Agopian
 Un ascenseur pour l'an neuf (1990)
 588 rue paradis (1992) - Nazareth
 L'honneur de la tribu (1993) - Le narrateur
 XY, drôle de conception (1996) - M. Fleury, le père d'Eric
 Ridicule (1996) - le Notaire
 Une femme très très très amoureuse (1997) - Forstock
 C'est la tangente que je préfère (1997) - Jean-Pierre
 Women (1997) - Alberto
 XXL (1997) - David Stern
 Le regard d'un ami (1998)
 Babel (1999) - Kazam's Voice (French version, voice)
 Voyages (1999) - Mendelbaum
 Joséphine, ange gardien (1999, TV Series) - Cyprien
 À vot' service (1999) - Le vieux monsieur / Old Man (segment "Monsieur Noël")
 The Widow of Saint-Pierre (2000) - The Governor's Father
 The Man on the Train (2002) - Le coiffeur
 Laisse tes mains sur mes hanches (2003) - Robert
 Le Cou de la girafe (2004) - Maurice
 Love Is in the Air (2005) - Le prêtre (uncredited)
 Le Pressentiment (2006) - An old man

References

External links
 

1923 births
2012 deaths
Male actors from Paris
French male stage actors
French male film actors
20th-century French male actors